Milena Glimbovski (born 1990 in Siberia, Soviet Union) is a Russian–German entrepreneur, author and zero-waste activist. Glimbovski became known mainly through the founding of the Berlin grocery store Original Unverpackt (Original Unpacked), in which goods are sold without disposable packaging.

Life
Glimbovski was born in 1990 in Siberia, in the former Soviet Union. In 1995, her family moved to Germany, where she grew up in Hanover and attended the Wilhelm Raabe School. After training as a media designer, Glimbovski began to study social and business communication at the Berlin University of the Arts, but later discontinued her studies.

After a long preparation period, Glimbovski launched a crowdfund with Sara Wolf in 2014 to finance the founding of their Original Unverpackt grocery store. The scheme successfully raised 100,000 euros. The shop opened on 13 September 2014 and continues to this day, although Glimbovski is no longer CEO. The opening of the Berlin location of Original Unverpackt was followed by numerous stores around Germany as well as worldwide. Glimbovski's founding of Original Unverpackt is considered by many to have triggered the zero-waste movement in Germany, raising awareness of not only the zero-waste store but of Glimbovski herself.

In 2015, together with Jan Lenarz, Glimbovski founded the publishing house "Ein guter Verlag", which sells books and calendars on the subject of mindfulness. Glimbovski is known as a speaker on sustainability and zero waste and appears at numerous conferences in Germany and abroad.

In November 2018, a jury of the Berlin Senate, the Investitionsbank Berlin and the Berlin IHK voted Glimbovski "Entrepreneur of the Year 2018".

Works
 Ohne Wenn und Abfall. Kiepenheuer & Witsch, 2017, .
 Weil ich ein Mädchen bin. In: Scarlett Curtis (Hrsg.): The Future is female! Was Frauen über Feminismus denken. Goldmann Verlag, 2018, S. 167–172.
 With Susanne Mierau and Katja Vogt: Einfach Familie leben. Der Minimalismus-Guide: Wohnen, Kleidung, Lifestyle, Achtsamkeit. Kneseback Verlag, April 2019, .

References

External links
 Official website of Original Unverpackt
 Speech by Milena Glombovski at re:publica

1990 births
Living people
German activists
German women environmentalists
21st-century German businesswomen
21st-century German businesspeople
Russian emigrants to Germany